April Hadi (born April 10, 1981) is an Indonesian footballer currently playing for Persija Jakarta in the Indonesia Super League.

References

External links

1981 births
Association football midfielders
Living people
Indonesian footballers
Liga 1 (Indonesia) players
PSPS Pekanbaru players
Indonesian Premier Division players